The Mare Island Naval Shipyard (MINSY) was the first United States Navy base established on the Pacific Ocean. The Napa River goes through the Mare Island Strait and separates the peninsula shipyard (Mare Island, California) from the main portion of the city of Vallejo. MINSY made a name for itself as the premier U.S. West Coast submarine port as well as serving as the controlling force in San Francisco Bay Area shipbuilding efforts during World War II.

The base closed in 1996 and has gone through several redevelopment phases. It was registered as a California Historical Landmark in 1960, and parts of it were declared a National Historic Landmark District in 1975.

Beginnings
In September 1849, Lieutenant Commander William Pope McArthur was placed in command of the US survey schooner Ewing, which had been brought around Cape Horn to the West Coast by Lieutenant Washington Allon Bartlett. Upon reaching San Francisco, Ewing and the other ship assigned to the survey, were hampered from progress due to desertions of their crews to the gold fields, including a mutiny when crew members rowing into the city from Ewing threw an officer overboard in an attempt to desert. They managed to survey the Mare Island Strait before steaming to Hawaii to obtain crewmen from Hawaiian monarch King Kamehameha III. They returned to San Francisco in the spring of 1850 with the coastal survey of northern California beginning on 4 April 1850 and continued up to the mouth of the Columbia River. On 1 August 1850, while still in Oregon, McArthur purchased a  interest in Mare Island for $468.50 then returned to San Francisco later that month to prepare charts and write reports.

On 15 January 1852, Secretary of the Navy William A. Graham ordered a Naval Commission to select a site for a naval yard on the Pacific Coast. Commodore D. Sloat along with Commodore C. Ringgold, Simon F. Blunt and William P.S. Sanger (former overseer of construction of Drydock Number One, Norfolk Naval Shipyard) were appointed to the commission. On 13 July 1852, Sloat recommended the island across the Napa River from the settlement of Vallejo.

The Navy purchased the original 956 acres (387 ha) of MINSY on 4 January 1853. McArthur's family share (he had died a few months after purchasing an interest in Mare Island) was $5,218.20. The Navy commenced shipbuilding operations on 16 September 1854 under the command of then-Commander David Farragut, who later gained fame during the U.S. Civil War Battle of Mobile Bay, when he gave the order, "Damn the torpedoes, full speed ahead!" MINSY served as a major Pacific Ocean repair station during the late 19th century, handling American as well as Japanese and Russian vessels in the course of duty.

In 1861, the longest lived of the clipper ships, was brought to Mare Island Navy Yard for $15,000 of repairs. Syren had struck Mile Rock twice while trying to sail out of the Golden Gate.

Marines first arrived for duty in 1862 under the command of Maj Addison Garland, who was the first officer to command the Marine barracks on the island.

Mare Island Naval Shipyard also took a commanding role in civil defense and emergency response on the West Coast, dispatching warships to the Pacific Northwest to subdue Native American unrest. Some of the support, logistics and munition requirements for the Spanish–American War were filled by Mare Island. MINSY sent men, materiel and ships to San Francisco in response to the fires following the 1906 earthquake. Arctic rescue missions were mounted as necessary. Ordnance manufacturing and storage were two further key missions at MINSY for nearly all of its active service, including ordnance used prior to the American Civil War.

In 1911, the Marine Corps established two West Coast recruit training depots first at Mare Island, the second at Puget Sound, Washington. Mare Island eventually became the West Coast's only recruit training facility when the Puget Sound operation consolidated to the San Francisco Bay Area in 1912. Instructors trained recruits there until 10 August 1923, when they relocated to the Marine Corps Recruit Depot San Diego. The Marine Barracks Mare Island remained.

World War I

In July 1917, MINSY was the site of a major explosion that killed six people. On July 9, a gunpowder magazine containing 127,600 pounds of black powder blew up, damaging a number of surrounding buildings, and leaving a mystery as to what had caused it. Suspicion settled on an identified German agent and possible saboteur, Lothar Witzke, but the investigation proved inconclusive and the official verdict was that the cause was unknown.  Stephen C. Ruder has suggested in a 2022 article that it may not have been an act of German sabotage but suicide by a civilian, Neil Damstedt, who was the principal victim and only individual inside the magazine at the moment of explosion.

MINSY saw major shipbuilding efforts during World War I. MINSY holds a shipbuilding speed record for a destroyer that still stands, launching  in just  days in May–June 1918. Mare Island was selected by the Navy for construction of the only US West Coast-built dreadnought battleship, launched in 1919. In 1904, the pre-dreadnought battleship  had been launched at Seattle, Washington. Noting the power of underwater warfare shown by German U-boats in World War I, the Navy doubled their Pacific-based submarine construction program at Puget Sound Naval Shipyard by founding a submarine program at MINSY in the early 1920s.

World War II

Base facilities included a hospital, ammunition depot, paint and rubber testing laboratories, and schools for firefighters, opticians, and anti-submarine attack during World War II. MINSY reached peak capacity for shipbuilding, repair, overhaul, and maintenance of many different kinds of seagoing vessels including both surface combatants and submarines.

Up to 50,000 workers were employed. Mare Island even received Royal Navy cruisers and destroyers and four Soviet Navy subs for service. Following the War, MINSY was considered to be one of the primary stations for construction and maintenance of the Navy's Pacific fleet of submarines, having built seventeen submarines and four submarine tenders by the end of hostilities.

Before World War II the Navy established Station I at Mare Island as one of four High Frequency Direction Finding (HFDF) stations on the Pacific mainland to track Japanese naval and merchant shipping east of Hawaii. The other stations were: Point Arguello, California (Station Z), Point Saint George, California (Station T), and Fort Stevens, Oregon (Station S).

War bonds
Patriotism and esprit de corps among the workers ran very high. Mare Island's military and civilian workforce raised almost $76M in war bonds; enough to pay for every one of the submarines built at MINSY prior to VJ Day. More than 300 landing craft were built at Mare Island.

Dry docks and slipways

Shipbuilding
Mare Island Naval Shipyard constructed at least eighty-nine seagoing vessels. Among the more important ships & boats built were:

 1858  – sloop-of-war, wood
 1872  – sloop-of-war, wood
 1874  – Steamer
 1875  – monitor, steel
 1886  – Revenue Cutter, wood
 1904  – training ship, steel barque
 1907  – collier, steel
 1911  – collier, steel. Later converted to aircraft carrier 
 1913  – tanker, steel
 1913  – Revenue Cutter Service harbor tug, wood
 1913  – gunboat, steel
 1913  – gunboat, steel
 1914  – tanker, steel
 1915  – tanker, steel
 1916 , destroyer – steel
 1916  – battleship, steel
 1916  – destroyer, steel
 1917 Fifteen submarine chasers – wood
 1917  – destroyer – (Destroyers for Bases Agreement)
 1917  – destroyer
 1918  – destroyer – (World War II)
 1918  – destroyer – (Guadalcanal campaign – Philippines campaign (1944–45) – Battle of Okinawa)
 1919  – destroyer – (World War II)
 1918  – destroyer – (attack on Pearl Harbor – Guadalcanal campaign – Philippines campaign)
 1918  – destroyer
 1919  – destroyer – (invasion of North Africa – Philippines campaign)
 1920  – battleship scrapped before completion under terms of the Washington Naval Treaty
 1920  – destroyer – (World War II)
 1920  – destroyer – (attack on Pearl Harbor – Guadalcanal campaign)
 1921  – destroyer – (attack on Pearl Harbor)
 1922  – destroyer – (attack on Pearl Harbor – Guadalcanal campaign)
 1922  – destroyer – (attack on Pearl Harbor – Battle of Peleliu)
 1922  – destroyer – (World War II)
 1927  – submarine (sank 6 ships in 14 World War II Pacific patrols)
 1 of 6  heavy cruisers
 1928  – (Battle of Savo Island – Battle of Rennell Island)
 1 of 7  heavy cruisers
 1931  – (attack on Pearl Harbor – Battle of Cape Esperance – Naval Battle of Guadalcanal – Battle of the Philippine Sea – Philippines campaign (1944–45) – Battle of Okinawa)
 2 of 18  destroyers
 1934  – (Battle of the Santa Cruz Islands – Philippines campaign)
 1934  – (Battle of the Santa Cruz Islands – Naval Battle of Guadalcanal)
 1 of 8  destroyers
 1935  – (attack on Pearl Harbor – Guadalcanal campaign)
 31 of 65 s
 1942 
 ...
 1943 
 1943 
 ...
 1944 
 
With the prelude to, and the outbreak of World War II, the Mare Island Naval Shipyard specialized in submarines, and other than a few submarine tenders and destroyer escorts, no more surface ships were built there. In 1955, Mare Island was awarded the contract to build , the first nuclear submarine laid down at a Pacific base.

In 1972, the Navy officially ceased building new nuclear submarines at Mare Island, though overhaul of existing vessels continued.  was decommissioned at Mare Island in 1980, then rigged for towing back to Groton, Connecticut, to serve as a museum of naval history.

 1 of 10 s
 1936  – sank 6 ships in 7 World War II Pacific patrols
 1 of 6 s
 1936  – sank 9 ships in 11 World War II Pacific patrols
 1 of 10 s
 1937  – sank 12 ships in 13 World War II Pacific patrols
 1939  – submarine tender – (World War II)
 2 of 12 s
 1939  – sank 4 ships in 13 World War II Pacific patrols
 1939  – sank 11 ships in 12 World War II Pacific patrols
 1941  – submarine tender – (World War II)
 1942  – submarine tender – (World War II)
 8 of 77 s
 1941  –  (sank 23 ships in 14 World War II Pacific patrols (3rd highest number for a U.S. submarine)
 1941  –  (sank 18 ships in 12 World War II Pacific patrols (11th highest number for a U.S. submarine)
 1942  –  (sank 20 ships in 7 World War II Pacific patrols (6th highest number for a U.S. submarine)
 1942  –  (sank 9 ships in 11 World War II Pacific patrols
 1942  –  (sank 15 ships in 11 World War II Pacific patrols
 1942  –  (sank 7 ships in 9 World War II Pacific patrols Vietnam War)
 1942  – submarine (sank 16 ships in 11 World War II Pacific patrols
 1942  –  (sank 3 ships 4 World War II Pacific patrols
 1943  – submarine tender – (World War II)
 10 of 120 s
 1943  –  (sank 20 ships in 8 World War II Pacific patrols (6th highest number for a U.S. submarine)
 1943  –  (sank 10 ships in 7 World War II Pacific patrols
 1943  –  (sank 24 ships in 5 World War II Pacific patrols (highest number for a U.S. submarine)
 1943  –  (sank 2 ships 6 World War II Pacific patrols
 1944  –  (sank 21 ships in 5 World War II Pacific patrols (4th highest number for a U.S. submarine)
 1944  –  (sank 11 ships in 5 World War II Pacific patrols
 1944  –  (sank 1 ship in 3 World War II Pacific patrols
 1944  –  (sank 4 ships in 3 World War II Pacific patrols
 1945  –  (1 World War II Pacific patrol)
 1947  – 
 1945  – submarine tender
 2 of 3 s
 1951 
 1951 
 1 of 2 s
 1957  – 

 1957  – submarine (nuclear powered) 
 1959  – submarine (nuclear powered) 
 1959  – submarine (nuclear powered) 
 1960  – submarine (nuclear powered) 
 1961  – submarine (nuclear powered) 
 1961  – submarine (nuclear powered) 
 1962  –  submarine (nuclear powered) 
 1963  – submarine (nuclear powered) 
 1963  – submarine (nuclear powered) 
 1963  – submarine (nuclear powered) 
 1964  – deep submergence bathyscaphe
 1965  – submarine (nuclear powered) 
 1965  - submarine (nuclear powered) 
 1967  – submarine (nuclear powered) 
 1968  –  submarine (nuclear powered) 
 1969  – submarine (nuclear powered) 
 1969  – submarine (nuclear powered) 
 1970  – submarine (nuclear powered)

Riverine training

In 1966, during the Vietnam War, the U.S. Navy transferred their Brown Water Navy Riverine Training Operations from Coronado, California, to Mare Island. Motorists traveling along Highway 37 could often see U.S. Navy River Patrol Boats, among other river assault type boats, maneuvering through the sloughs of what is now the Napa-Sonoma State Wildlife Area, which borders the north and west portions of Mare Island.

U.S. Navy Reserve Units may still operate the slough portions of the State Wildlife Area for training purposes, as the navigable waters are considered public property. The U.S. Navy Brown Water Riverine Forces were inactivated after the Vietnam War, maintaining only the U.S. Naval Reserve PBRs and auxiliary craft at Mare Island, until the 1996 base closure.

U.S. Naval Construction Battalion Unit 421

Mare Island was also home to the Seabees CBU 421 who completed many construction projects in the bay area including renovation and restoration of St. Peter's  chapel. St. Peter's is the oldest Navy Chapel in the United states built in 1901.

Pacific Reserve Fleet, Mare Island
Pacific Reserve Fleet, Mare Island was a large US reserve fleet that opened in 1946 to store the many surplus ships after World War II. As part of the United States Navy reserve fleets, the fleet "mothballed" ships and submarines. Some ships in the fleet were reactivated for the Korean War and Vietnam War. The Reserve Fleet closed in 1996 with the shipyard. The ships were scrapped or moved to other reserve fleets.

Base closure
Mare Island Naval Shipyard expanded to over  during its service life and was responsible for construction of over 500 naval vessels and overhauling thousands of other vessels. Though it remained a strong contender for continued operations, MINSY was identified for closure during the Base Realignment and Closure (BRAC) process of 1993. Naval operations ceased and the facility was decommissioned on 1 April 1996.

The California Conservation Corps, Touro University California, and numerous commercial and industrial businesses are currently leasing property aboard the former naval shipyard. In May 2000, the Navy completed the transfer of a former housing area called Roosevelt Terrace using an "economic development conveyance"; a method to accelerate the transfer of BRAC facilities back to civilian communities for their economic benefit. The Navy is also transferring property at the shipyard to other government agencies such as Fish and Wildlife Service refuge, a Forest Service office building, an Army Reserve Center, a Coast Guard communications facility, and a Department of Education school.

Appearances in popular culture
The shipyard was featured by Huell Howser in California's Gold Episode 704.

See also
Rosie the Riveter/World War II Home Front National Historical Park
California during World War II

References
Notes

Bibliography

 Blackman, Raymond V.B.  Jane's Fighting Ships 1970–71.  London: Jane's Yearbooks.
 
 Lott, Arnold S., Lt. Comdr., U.S.N.  A Long Line of Ships: Mare Island's Century of Naval Activity in California.  Annapolis: United States Naval Institute, 1954.
 Silverstone, Paul H.,  U.S. Warships of World War II.  New York: Doubleday & Company, 1968.
 Steffes, James, ENC Retired. Swift Boat Down: The Real Story of the Sinking of PCF-19.  (2006); .
 Tillman, Barrett Clash of the Carriers.  New York: New American Library, 2005. .
 1941 Society of Naval Architects Bulletin, Harold W. Linnehan, writing as a visitor from Design section, Mare Island, California.

External links

Brief history written in 1939
Recently written history with photos
Mare Island Navy Yard – 1928. Elbridge Ayer Burbank pencil sketch.
National Park Service World War II in the San Francisco Bay Area: Mare Island Naval Shipyard
Mare Island Historic Park Foundation

St.Peter's Chapel "http://www.mareislandmuseum.org/venues/st-peters-chapel/" 

United States Navy shipyards
San Pablo Bay
Buildings and structures in Solano County, California
Historic American Engineering Record in California
Military facilities in the San Francisco Bay Area
Military installations closed in 1996
Formerly Used Defense Sites in California
Military facilities on the National Register of Historic Places in California
National Register of Historic Places in Solano County, California
History of Solano County, California
1854 establishments in California
Historic districts on the National Register of Historic Places in California
Shipyards on the National Register of Historic Places
Mare Island
Transportation buildings and structures in Solano County, California
National Historic Landmarks in the San Francisco Bay Area
Closed installations of the United States Navy
Shipyards building World War II warships